Sidónio is a masculine given name which may refer to:

 Sidónio Pais (1872–1918), Portuguese politician, military officer, diplomat and president of the First Portuguese Republic
 Sidónio (footballer) (born 1939), Portuguese former footballer Sidónio da Silva Bastos Manhiça

See also
 Sidonia, a feminine given name
 Sidonius Apollinaris (c. 430–before 490), Gallo-Roman poet, diplomat, bishop and saint

Portuguese masculine given names